King Nyangelizwe (Tutor Vulindlela Ndamase; born in 1921 – died 1997), he is the son of King  Victor Poto Ndamase Aa! Bhekuzulu! and the King of Western Mpondo in Libode. He is brother to Queen Nolizwe Ndamase-Sandile, the wife of  amaRharhabe King Mxolisi Bazindlovu Sandile and mother of King Zanesizwe Sandile; Queen Nondwe Seziwe Ndamase-Sigcawu the wife of Xhosa King Xolilizwe Sigcawu; and Chieftain Nolusapho Phumla Ndamase-Mabandla, the wife of first Chief Minister of Ciskei and AmaBhele aseTyhume Chief Thandathu Jongilizwe Mabandla. 

He was the third and the last President of Transkei succeeding Kaiser Matanzima from 20 February 1986 to 26 April 1994 under Transkei National Independence Party as an Independent. 

He died in 1997.

References

Presidents of Transkei
1997 deaths
People from the Eastern Cape
Xhosa people